Čokori is a village in the municipality of Banja Luka, Republika Srpska, Bosnia and Herzegovina.

Demographics
Ethnic groups in the village include:
198 Serbs (99.50%)
1 Other (0.50%)

References

Villages in Republika Srpska
Populated places in Banja Luka